State Road 506 (NM 506) is a  state highway in the US state of New Mexico. NM 506's western terminus is at U.S. Route 54 (US 54) north of Orogrande, and the eastern terminus is at the state line with Texas, by Dell City, Texas.

Major intersections

See also

References

506
Transportation in Otero County, New Mexico